The Texas Open, known as the Valero Texas Open for sponsorship reasons, is a professional golf tournament on the PGA Tour, played near San Antonio, Texas. It dates back  years to 1922, when it was first called the Texas Open; San Antonio-based Valero Energy Corporation took over naming rights in 2002. It is played at The Oaks Course at the TPC San Antonio, northeast of the city. The Valero Energy Foundation is the host organization for the Valero Texas Open.

The event is managed by Wasserman Media Group as of 2017. In 2003, it was the site of the 72-hole PGA Tour scoring record of 254, shot by Tommy Armour III. Many big-name players have won this tournament, including Sam Snead, Ben Hogan, and Arnold Palmer, who won it three years in a row. It has always been considered a tournament where it is relatively easy to shoot low scores. Since 1934, every tournament winner has finished with a score under-par.

It has always been played in the San Antonio area, and is the sixth oldest professional golf tournament worldwide, the third oldest on the PGA Tour and the longest held in the same city.  The tournament has been hosted on eight different golf courses. From its inception until 1940, it was held at Brackenridge Park Golf Course, with the exception of 1927–1928, when it was played at Willow Springs Golf Course. After the event left Brackenridge Park, it returned to Willow Springs . In 1950 and 1951, it was played at both Brackenridge Park and Ft. Sam Houston Golf Course; afterwards it stayed at Brackenridge Park, with the exception of 1956 and 1960, when it returned to Ft. Sam Houston.

Oak Hills Country Club hosted from 1961 to 1966, then it went to Pecan Valley Golf Club  There was no event in 1968, as Pecan Valley was the site of the PGA Championship in July. No event was held in 1971; it was played at Woodlake Golf Club for five editions  then returned to Oak Hills  (No event was held in 1987, as Oak Hills hosted the first Tour Championship in late October.) 

It was held at the Resort Course at La Cantera Golf Club  then moved to its present site on The Oaks Course at TPC San Antonio, in the affluent Cibolo Canyon community, 

The Texas Open was usually held in September or October; in 2007 and 2008, the event was demoted to the Fall Series. With the demise of the Atlanta Classic, the PGA Tour moved the Texas Open into that slot on the schedule in May 2009 and it became a regular FedEx Cup event. The 2009 event offered an increased purse of $6.1 million (up from $4.5 million) and its winner's share exceeded  for the first time. In 2011, the event moved to the week following the Masters Tournament; that 2011 edition is best known for Kevin Na's 16 (+12) on the ninth hole in the opening round.

As a Fall Series event, the Valero Texas Open was the alternate tournament to the Presidents and Ryder Cups. In 2013, the tournament was in early April, the week before The Masters, and aired on NBC for the first time; several European Tour players participated in the Texas Open for the first time since the mid-1980s.

Since Valero became title sponsor in 2002, the tournament has become the annual leader in charitable fundraising among PGA Tour events. In 2015, the Valero Texas Open become only the fourth PGA Tour event to eclipse the $100 million milestone in funds raised for charity.  The 2021 Valero Texas Open raised a record breaking $16 million for charity, bringing the grand total to over $187 million in charitable giving.

In 2019, the Valero Texas Open returned to being played before The Masters, thereby shifting the weekend coverage from CBS to NBC.

Due to the COVID-19 pandemic, the Valero Texas Open was cancelled just three weeks before taking place but returned in 2021, the week before The Masters.

Course layout
Oaks Course

Source:

Highlights
1951: Al Brosch became the first player to record a round of 60 in a PGA Tour event.
1955: Mike Souchak's 257 (–27) set records for a 72-hole PGA Tour event: the under-par record stood until John Huston's 28-under par 260 at the 1998 Hawaiian Open, and the scoring record lasted until 2001, when Mark Calcavecchia shot 256 (–28) at the Phoenix Open.
2004: Oft-injured Bart Bryant, recovering from elbow surgery and playing on a Major Medical Extension, earned his first PGA Tour win in his 187th start.
2005: Robert Gamez won his first event since March 1990, giving him the record for longest time between PGA Tour wins.
2017: After 180 PGA Tour starts and six runner-up finishes, Kevin Chappell birdied the 72nd hole for his first PGA Tour win.
2019: Corey Conners, playing on conditional status, Monday qualified for the tournament and earned his first PGA Tour win the week before the Masters. He was the first player to win on the PGA Tour after qualifying on a Monday in nine years.

Winners

Note: Green highlight indicates scoring records.
Sources:

Multiple winners
Nine men have won this tournament more than once through 2021.
3 wins
Arnold Palmer: 1960, 1961, 1962
Justin Leonard: 2000, 2001, 2007
2 wins
Bill Mehlhorn: 1928, 1929
Sam Snead: 1948, 1950
Dutch Harrison: 1939, 1951
Ben Crenshaw: 1973, 1986
Jay Haas: 1982, 1993
Duffy Waldorf: 1995, 1999
Zach Johnson: 2008, 2009

Notes

References

External links

Coverage on the PGA Tour's official site

PGA Tour events
Golf in Texas
Sports competitions in San Antonio
Recurring sporting events established in 1922
1922 establishments in Texas